The October 1888 Merthyr Tydfil by-election was a parliamentary by-election held for the House of Commons constituency of Merthyr Tydfil in Wales on 26 October 1888.

Vacancy
The by-election was caused by the death of the sitting Liberal MP, Henry Richard on 20 August 1888.

Candidates
Two candidates nominated.

The Liberal Party (UK) nominated Baptist Minister  Richard Foulkes Griffiths.

Welsh solicitor, mine owner, and company promoter William Pritchard-Morgan ran as an Independent Liberal

Results

References

1888 elections in the United Kingdom
By-elections to the Parliament of the United Kingdom in Welsh constituencies
1888 in Wales
1880s elections in Wales
October 1888 events
Politics of Merthyr Tydfil